Dominik Sváček (born 24 February 1997) is a Czech footballer who plays as a goalkeeper for MFK Tatran Liptovský Mikuláš, on loan from Viktoria Plzeň.

Club career

Viktoria Plzeň
He played his first match for FC Viktoria Plzeň on 27 May 2017 against FC Vysočina Jihlava. He played last 27 minutes when he came on the pitch for injured Petr Bolek.

Since then he played mainly for reserve team in Bohemian Football League.

International career
He had played international football at under-16, 17, 18, 19 and 20 level for Czech Republic U16, Czech Republic U17, Czech Republic U18, Czech Republic U19 and Czech Republic U20. He played in 14 matches in national teams.

External links
https://repre.fotbal.cz/hrac/hraci/3993
 

1997 births
Living people
Czech footballers
Czech Republic youth international footballers
Association football goalkeepers
Czech First League players
Bohemian Football League players
FC Viktoria Plzeň players
MFK Tatran Liptovský Mikuláš players
Expatriate footballers in Slovakia
People from Klatovy
Sportspeople from the Plzeň Region